Donnar A. Dromberg (22 September 1908 – 27 June 1992) was a Finnish philatelist who was added to the Roll of Distinguished Philatelists in 1977. He was an expert in the philately of South America.

Dromberg was the special representative for Finland for the Royal Philatelic Society London.

Selected publications
Via Gothenberg. Finnish Philatelic Federation.

References

Signatories to the Roll of Distinguished Philatelists
1908 births
1992 deaths
Finnish philatelists
Fellows of the Royal Philatelic Society London